Mission Chapel, a Congregational Church, was built around 1814 in New Amsterdam, Berbice, Guyana. Mission Chapel is located at 12 Chapel Street, New Amsterdam, Berbice.

History
It was founded by the Rev. John Wray, and was the first church to open its doors to slaves, and the first without separate seating. The history of the church dates back to around 1812 when Rev. Wray paid a visit to the Berbice slaves and was inspired to stay and help teach them. A large tamarind tree, beneath which Rev. Wray would sit to teach the slaves to read and write, still occupies part of the church compound.  Wray, who served for 24 years, is buried in Stanleytown, New Amsterdam.

The church was opened in 1819 and was twice enlarged. It was destroyed by fire in 1824. The church was rebuilt in 1825, and again in 1944. Mission Chapel probably has the largest seating capacity of all churches in Guyana - 1,500 seats.

A two-storey church manse was built in 1899.

In 1969, the Rev. Pat Matthews became the first Guyanese pastor at Mission Chapel. In 1978 he was honoured for meritorious service among the Amerindians.

In 1966, the Government made a gift of $25,000 to the residents of Berbice to renovate and further preserve the church. In 1976, the structure was named a historic one by the Government of Guyana. In 2001, Mission Chapel was designated a National Heritage Site by the Ministry of Tourism, Industry and Commerce.

References

History of Guyana
Congregational churches
Churches in Guyana
New Amsterdam, Guyana